Sir Mahadev Bhaskar Chaubal K.C.I.E., C.S.I., B.A., LL.B. was Acting Chief Justice of the Bombay High Court during the British Raj.

In 1912, Chaubal was a member of the Executive Council of the Governor of Bombay. He also served as a member of the Royal Commission on Public Services in India, along with Gopal Krishna Gokhale.

References

Scholars from Mumbai
Companions of the Order of the Star of India
Judges of the Bombay High Court
Knights Commander of the Order of the Indian Empire
Marathi people
20th-century Indian judges